The following events occurred in November 1962:

November 1, 1962 (Thursday)
Mars 1, also known as Sputnik 24, was launched by the Soviet Union as part of its Mars program, with an expected arrival date of June. The probe would come within  of Mars on June 19, 1963, but the system that adjusted the probe's antenna to maintain contact with Earth would fail on March 21, 1963.
Soviet scientist Lev Landau was awarded the 1962 Nobel Prize for Physics in recognition of "his pioneering theories for condense matter, especially liquid helium".
The first issue of the comic series Diabolik was published in Italy.
The United States resumed its arms blockade of ships bound for Cuba, after a two-day suspension during which negotiations had taken place. Meanwhile, the Soviet Union began dismantling its missiles there.
Mercury Procedures Trainer No. 1, redesignated Mercury Simulator, was moved from Langley Field on July 23, 1962, and installed and readied for operations in a Manned Spacecraft Center building at Ellington Air Force Base, Houston, Texas.
Born: Anthony Kiedis, American rock musician and singer (Red Hot Chili Peppers), in Grand Rapids, Michigan
Died:
Pyotr Dolgov, 42, colonel in the Soviet Air Force and balloonist. Andreyev successfully reached the ground and set an official record for the longest distance free-fall parachute jump, but Dolgov was killed by the explosive decompression of his pressure suit. Both men would be named Heroes of the Soviet Union on December 12, 1962.
Ricardo Rodríguez, 20, Mexican racing driver, was killed in a crash while practicing for the Mexican Grand Prix at Magdalena Mixhuca Circuit.

November 2, 1962 (Friday)
The Australian Ballet gave its first ever performance.
In response to the Sino-Indian War, the United States began airlifting weapons to India, with U.S. Air Force C-130 transport planes transporting mountain artillery from its West German bases to match the weaponry of the People's Republic of China.
A final agreement was reached between the Soviet Union and the United States on the terms for Soviet removal of nuclear missiles from Cuba and American verification.  U.S. President John F. Kennedy announced the plan, resolving the Cuban Missile Crisis  on television that evening.
Born: David Brock, American journalist and founder of Media Matters for America, in Washington, D.C.
Died: 
Godfrey Lowell Cabot, 101, American industrialist and philanthropist 
Tripuraneni Gopichand, 52, Telugu language writer

November 3, 1962 (Saturday)
As the state of emergency in India continued, the Defence of India Ordinance took effect. President Sarvepalli Radhakrishnan suspended Article 21 (preventing the deprivation of life or liberty without due process) and Article 22 (prohibiting "preventive detention") of the Constitution of India. 
A group of bandits murdered 25 passengers and the driver on a bus that was traveling near the city of Neiva, Huila in Colombia. The group appeared on the road, ordered the bus to stop, fired guns inside and then hacked the occupants to death with machetes. Six other people survived the attack with injuries.
The earliest use of the term "personal computer" by the media was made in The New York Times in a story about John W. Mauchly's speech the day before to the American Institute of Industrial Engineers. Mauchly, "inventor of some of the original room-size computers" said that "in a decade or so", everyone would have their own computer with "exchangeable wafer-thin data storage files to provide inexhaustible memories and answer most problems". Mauchly was quoted as saying, "There is no reason to suppose the average boy or girl cannot be master of a personal computer."  
In what one author describes as a milestone in the term "country music" replacing what had been referred to as "country and western", Billboard magazine renamed its "Hot C&W Singles" chart to "Hot Country Singles" and stopped referring to "western" music altogether.
Born: Amy B. Smith, American computer engineer, in Lexington, Massachusetts; Jacqui Smith, British politician and former Home Secretary, known for her involvement in the United Kingdom parliamentary expenses scandal
Died: Harlow Curtice, 69, American automobile executive and President of General Motors from 1953 to 1958

November 4, 1962 (Sunday)
The United States conducted an atmospheric nuclear test for the last time, and all of its tests since then have been made underground. The Soviet Union would halt atmospheric testing less than two months later, the last explosion being on Christmas Day. The last atmospheric test ever would be by China on October 16, 1980.
The body of USAF Major Rudolf Anderson, the only fatality in the Cuban Missile Crisis, was returned to the United States by Cuba.
The first Mexican Grand Prix was won by Jim Clark and Trevor Taylor.
Born: Jean-Pierre Bemba, Congolese presidential candidate in 2006, former Vice-President, and convicted war criminal; in Bokada
Died: Enos, 6, the first chimpanzee to orbit the earth. Enos was sent up by the U.S. aboard the Mercury-Atlas 5 (MA-5) spacecraft three months before John Glenn's orbital flight. The chimpanzee had been sick and under night and day observation and treatment for two months before his death. He was afflicted with shigella dysentary, a type resistant to antibiotics, and this caused his death. Officials at Holloman Air Force Base in New Mexico, where Enos died, said that there was "no connection with the two-orbit space flight the chimp made Nov. 29, 1961."

November 5, 1962 (Monday)
President Ayub Khan of Pakistan was given a note from U.S. Ambassador Walter P. McConaughy, on authorization from President Kennedy, which said that "The Government of the United States of America reaffirms its previous assurances to the Government of Pakistan that it will come to Pakistan's assistance in the event of aggression from India against Pakistan." The existence of the pledge was kept secret, but in 1971, National Security Adviser Henry Kissinger would reveal its existence to Anatoly Dobrynin, the Soviet Ambassador to the U.S.
Saudi Arabia broke off diplomatic relations with Egypt, following a period of unrest partly caused by the defection of several Saudi princes to Egypt.
A coal mining disaster in Ny-Ålesund, on the Arctic island of Spitsbergen, killed 21 people. The Norwegian government would be forced to resign in August 1963 in the aftermath of this accident.
The Rotary Club service organization established the Rotary Interact program for boys aged 12 to 18, with the first chapter in Melbourne, Florida.
Goddard Space Flight Center announced the award of contracts totaling approximately $12 million to modify NASA's Manned Space Flight Tracking Network to support long-duration and rendezvous missions. The contracts were with the Canoga Electronics Corporation, Van Nuys, California, for the tracking antenna acquisition aid system ($1.045 million); Radiation, Inc., Melbourne, Florida, for digital command encoders ($1.95 million); Collins Radio Company, Dallas, Texas, for the radio frequency command system ($1.725 million); and Electro-Mechanical Research, Inc., Sarasota, Florida, for the pulse code modulation system ($7,376,379).
Martin Luther King Jr. visited the University of Michigan. In the course of the day, he made a speech at Hill Auditorium and participated in a group discussion at the Michigan Union.

November 6, 1962 (Tuesday)
In his first meeting with his cabinet, Saudi Arabia's Prime Minister and Crown Prince Faisal bin Abdulaziz Al Saud (who would become the King in 1964) announced the immediate abolition of slavery within the Kingdom and plans to have the government pay owners for the manumission of their slaves as part of a program of modernization and reform.
The United Nations General Assembly passed a resolution condemning South Africa's racist apartheid policies and called for all UN member states to cease military and economic relations with the nation. The result was 67 in favor, 16 against (including the U.S., the U.K., France, Japan, Canada, New Zealand and South Africa), and 27 abstaining.
In midterm elections in the United States, the ruling Democratic Party maintained control of the House of Representatives (261-174) and increased its majority in the Senate (64-36). Former U.S. Vice-President Richard M. Nixon, who had narrowly lost the 1960 presidential election to John F. Kennedy, was heavily defeated in his bid to become Governor of California, while the President's younger brother, 30-year-old Teddy Kennedy, was elected U.S. Senator for Massachusetts. 
James E. Mills, the editor of the Birmingham Post-Herald, was arrested for violating Alabama's state election laws after publishing an editorial in that newspaper, urging voters to support a proposed change in city government. Under the law, soliciting votes on election day was a criminal offense. A trial court initially dismissed the charges as an unconstitutionally-broad interpretation of the law against electioneering on the day of an election, but the Alabama Supreme Court would reverse the dismissal and send the case back to trial. On May 23, 1966, the U.S. Supreme Court, in Mills v. Alabama, would reverse the Alabama Court, with Justice Hugo Black noting that "Suppression of the right of the press to... contend for or against change, which was all this editorial did, muzzles one of the very agencies the framers of our Constitution thoughtfully and deliberately selected to improve our society and keep it free."
B. F. Goodrich delivered a prototype partial-wear, quick-assembly, full-pressure suit to Manned Spacecraft Center (MSC) for evaluation by Life Systems Division. The partial-wear feature of this suit, demanded by the long-duration missions planned for the Gemini program, comprised detachable suit components (sleeves, legs, helmets). This was the second of two partial-wear suit prototypes called for by the original contract; but MSC had, in the meantime, requested B. F. Goodrich to provide 14 more suits based on this design. The additional suits varied only in size; they were to follow the design of the prototype according to the specifications of October 10, 1962. The prototype, originally designated G-2G, became G-2G-1 and the remaining suits were designated G-2G-2 through G-2G-15. MSC requested extensive design changes after evaluating G-2G-1 and several other suits. The final model was G-2G-8, delivered to MSC on January 21, 1963. It was later rejected in favor of a suit designed by David Clark Company, Inc., Worcester, Massachusetts, which incorporated B. F. Goodrich helmets, gloves, and additional hardware.
Voters in San Francisco, Alameda County and Contra Costa County, California approved the creation of the Bay Area Rapid Transit (BART) system.

November 7, 1962 (Wednesday)
South African dissident Nelson Mandela began a five-year prison sentence. Partway through his time behind bars, he was indicted and convicted for other crimes, and remained in prison for an additional 22 years, until 1990. In 1994, he would be elected the first black President of South Africa. 
Soviet Premier Khrushchev announced that the withdrawal of Soviet missiles from Cuba was complete. By agreement of the two superpowers, the United States Navy searched all Soviet vessels leaving Cuba to ensure that the missiles were being transported back to the U.S.S.R., and over the next three days, all 42 ballistic missiles had passed through the inspection, bringing an end to the Cuban Missile Crisis.
The Convention on Consent to Marriage, Minimum Age for Marriage, and Registration of Marriages was opened for signature and ratification by United Nations General Assembly resolution 1763 A (XVII).
The morning after losing his race for California Governor, a bitter Richard M. Nixon told reporters that "You don't have Nixon to kick around any more, because, gentlemen, this is my last press conference".
Died: Eleanor Roosevelt, 78, former First Lady of the United States, at her apartment on 55 East 74th Street in Manhattan, from cardiac failure due to aplastic anemia and tuberculosis.

November 8, 1962 (Thursday)
Glenn Hall, goalie for the Chicago Black Hawks of the National Hockey League, ended his streak of consecutive games at 552, taking himself out of the game against the visiting Boston Bruins ten minutes after it started.  "It was the first time he missed a minute of play since the first game of the 1955-56 season," a wire service report noted.
Parliamentary elections were held in the Faroe Islands.  The Social Democratic Party won 8 of the 29 seats, to become the largest single party in the Løgting.
Died: Willis H. O'Brien, 76, American special effects producer whose stop-motion animation earned him an Academy Award in 1950.

November 9, 1962 (Friday)
Brigadier Sir Bernard Fergusson became Governor-General of New Zealand, the last British native to be appointed to that position.
India's Defence Minister Krishna Menon was forced to resign as the Sino-Indian War proved to be disastrous to India.

American test pilot John B. McKay was seriously injured in a forced landing of a North American X-15 spaceplane at Mud Lake, Nevada. Although McKay's injuries did not appear to be disabling at the time, they would eventually shorten his career.
Project Gemini sled ejection test No. 1 was conducted at Naval Ordnance Test Station. Despite its designation, this test did not call for seats actually to be ejected. Its purpose was to provide data on the aerodynamic drag of the test vehicle and to prove the test vehicle's structural soundness in preparation for future escape system tests. The test vehicle, mounted by boilerplate spacecraft No. 3 (a welded steel mock-up of the Gemini spacecraft aerodynamically similar to the flight article), was a rocket-propelled sled running on tracks. Although test objectives were achieved, the boilerplate spacecraft was severely damaged when one of the sled motors broke loose and penetrated the heatshield, causing a fire which destroyed much instrumentation and equipment. Despite repairs required for the boilerplate and major modification or rebuilding of the sled, Gemini Project Office foresaw no delay in the sled test program.
Died: Louise Hanson Dyer, 78, Australian music publisher and patron of the arts

November 10, 1962 (Saturday)
Evacuation of the Indian state of Assam began as troops from China invaded India in the course of the Sino-Indian War. Residents of East Pakistan (now Bangladesh) prepared for a probable Chinese takeover as well. Rather than conquering Assam, however, China would later withdraw its forces.
Thai educator and writer Mom Luang Pin Malakul was awarded the West German Federal Cross of Merit, and the Belgian Order of Leopold.
The funeral service for Eleanor Roosevelt took place at St. James Episcopal Church in Hyde Park, New York.  Sitting next to each other in the same pew were two former Presidents of the United States (Harry S Truman and Dwight D. Eisenhower), the current President (John F. Kennedy) and the next President, Vice-President (Lyndon B. Johnson).
U.S. President Kennedy signed Executive Order 11063, directing an end to discrimination in public housing that received any federal assistance. However, the order was prospective only and did not apply to "low income units built or planned before November 20, 1962".
Died: John Alden, 54, Australian actor and Shakespearean director, died of a coronary occlusion

November 11, 1962 (Sunday)
The French ship Jean Gougy ran aground at Land's End, Cornwall, United Kingdom and capsized. Eight of the twenty crew were rescued by helicopter or breeches buoy. Sergeant Eric Smith of 22 Squadron, Royal Air Force would be awarded a George Medal for his actions in the rescue.
The first constitution for Kuwait was approved by the Emir, Abdullah III Al-Salim Al-Sabah, providing for an elected unicameral parliament of 50 members, an executive rule by "the descendants of the late Mubarak Al-Sabah", and specifying, in Article 2, that in the absence of specific legislation, the Sharia Islamic law was to govern the emirate's jurisprudence.
Article 14 of the Indian Constitution, the right to equal protection of the laws, was suspended by Presidential order as part of the Defence of India Ordinance; the suspension of constitutional rights under Articles 15, 21 and 22 would remain in effect until January 1969. 
Born: Demi Moore, American actress, as Demetria Guynes in Roswell, New Mexico

November 12, 1962 (Monday)
Two hand surgeons, Dr. Harold E. Kleinert and Dr. Mort Kasdan, performed the first successful revascularization of a severed digit (in this case, a partially amputated thumb) on a human patient, reconnecting the dorsal veins in order to restore function to the hand.  The procedure took place at the University of Louisville hospital.
U.S. Attorney General Robert F. Kennedy attended a reception for the visiting  Bolshoi Ballet troupe at the Soviet Embassy in Washington, and passed along a verbal message from the President to Ambassador Dobrynin, to send to Chairman Khrushchev.  In return for the U.S.S.R. announcing plans to remove their Ilyushin Il-28 bombers from Cuba over a 30-day period, President Kennedy said, the U.S. would end its blockade.
Born:  
Mariella Frostrup, Norwegian journalist and television presenter, in Oslo 
Naomi Wolf, American author and political consultant, in San Francisco

November 13, 1962 (Tuesday)
For the first time since the 7th century AD, a new name was added to the Canon of the Mass of the Roman Catholic Church, as Pope John XXIII added Saint Joseph, the earthly father of Jesus Christ, to the list of people venerated in the Communicantes.

After American philatelists discovered a rare printing error, known to collectors now as the Dag Hammarskjöld invert, that affected 400 of the hundreds of thousands of four-cent commemorative stamps, U.S. Postmaster General J. Edward Day ordered 400,000 identical misprints in order to reduce the value of the original goofs, and commented, "The Post Office Department isn't run as a jackpot operation." The mistake, which had changed the background on two sheets of 200 stamps, had been the first by the U.S. Post Office in 44 years and made each 4-cent issue worth as much as 350 dollars to collectors. Collector Leonard Sherman, who had purchased an unbroken sheet of 50 inverts, saw a potential fortune of $175,000 get deflated to $2.
Gordon Cooper was named as the pilot for the Mercury-Atlas 9 (MA-9) 1-day orbital mission slated for April 1963. Alan Shepard, pilot of Mercury-Redstone 3 (MR-3), was designated as backup pilot.
The B. F. Goodrich Company reported that it had successfully designed, fabricated, and tested a pivoted light attenuation tinted visor to be mounted on a government-issued Mercury spacesuit helmet.
Died: Baron Stasys Šilingas, 77, Lithuanian lawyer and statesman

November 14, 1962 (Wednesday)
Eritrea, for ten years an autonomous unit that was part of a federation with Ethiopia, lost its independence by annexation as the 14th province of the Ethiopian Empire. With a force of Ethiopian soldiers outside the Eritrean Assembly building in the region's capital, Asmara, the Eritrean administrator, Asfaha Woldemichael, urged the Assembly to pass a resolution to unite with the "Motherland". The next day, Ethiopia's Emperor Haile Selassie issued Order No. 27, citing the unanimous approval of the Assembly. After another 18 years of war, Eritrea would regain its independence in 1991.
In the Quebec general election, the Quebec Liberal Party, led by Jean Lesage, was re-elected.
At about 1:30 AM, the southeast door of the Salt Lake Temple of the Church of Jesus Christ of Latter-day Saints (LDS Church), located on Temple Square in Salt Lake City, Utah, was bombed. FBI agents state that the explosive had been wrapped around the door handles on the southeast entrance of the temple. The large wooden entrance doors were damaged by flying fragments of metal and glass, and eleven exterior windows were shattered. Damage to interior walls occurred  inside the temple, but damage to the interior was minor.

November 15, 1962 (Thursday)
Danish Defence Minister Poul Hansen resigned his position to replace the recently deceased Hans R. Knudsen as Minister of Finance.
The Greek freighter Captain George, with a cargo of explosives, caught fire during a storm while sailing in the Caribbean Sea near Bermuda.
Archie Moore, who had reigned as boxing's world light heavyweight champion between 1952 and 1962, fought unbeaten challenger Cassius Clay (later Muhammad Ali) in Los Angeles. Clay, who had gained a reputation as "the Louisville Lip who calls the round for a knockout and makes it come true", predicted that he would win in four rounds and knocked Moore out in the fourth.  
Died: Irene Gibbons, 61, American film costume designer. Mrs. Gibbons, who billed herself simply as "Irene", checked into Room 1129 of the Knickerbocker Hotel in Los Angeles, drank heavily, wrote a suicide note and then jumped to her death.

November 16, 1962 (Friday)
The Russian-language literary magazine Novy Mir published part of the novel One Day in the Life of Ivan Denisovich, by Aleksandr Solzhenitsyn, with the support of Soviet Communist Party Chairman Khrushchev, giving hope to authors that government censorship of literature in the U.S.S.R. would be eased.
Tipped off by an anonymous letter to French Cultural Affairs Minister Andre Malraux, police went to a barn at Villiers-Saint-Georges and recovered 56 paintings that had been stolen on July 16, 1961. The works, taken from the Annonciade museum in Saint-Tropez, were hidden under a pile of hay and were valued at $2.2 million. The thieves, who apparently were unable to sell the masterpieces anywhere, left a message saying, "We beg forgiveness for having stolen these works of art. By giving them back we hope our crime will be forgotten."
The Detroit trolleybus system went out of service, for the second and last time.
SA-3, an uncrewed craft in the Apollo program, was launched by the U.S. from Cape Canaveral Air Force Station Launch Complex 34 and destroyed five minutes later, as part of an experiment code-named Project Highwater.
The Manned Spacecraft Center presented the U.S. Department of Defense with recovery and network support requirements for the Mercury-Atlas 9 (MA-9) 1-day crewed orbital mission.
Mercury spacecraft 15A was delivered to Cape Canaveral for the Mercury-Atlas 10 (MA-10) orbital crewed 1-day mission.
Andre J. Meyer, Jr., of Gemini Project Office reported that Space Technology Laboratories was conducting a study for NASA Headquarters on a "T-back" pod to be used in the Gemini spacecraft adapter as the rendezvous target instead of the Agena. The pod would be stabilized but would have no translation capabilities. Although it would be almost as expensive as the Agena, it would avoid separate launch problems.
Born: Gary "Mani" Mounfield, English bass guitarist for The Stone Roses, in Manchester

November 17, 1962 (Saturday)
In the UK, the Seaham life-boat George Elmey capsized while entering harbour after rescuing the crew of a fishing boat. All five crew and four of the five survivors were killed.
At Chantilly, Virginia,  from Washington, D.C., U.S. President Kennedy dedicated Dulles International Airport, named after the late U.S. Secretary of State John Foster Dulles.
A fire broke out in a chamber at the U.S. Navy's Air Crew Equipment Laboratory during a pure oxygen test. The fire started when a faulty ground wire arced onto nearby insulation. After attempts to extinguish the fire by smothering it, the crew escaped the chamber with minor burns across large parts of their bodies.
The Alabama Crimson Tide, the #1 ranked college football team in the U.S., lost, 7-6, to the Georgia Tech Yellowjackets 7–6, bringing to an end a 19-game winning streak.
Died: Arthur Vining Davis, 95, American multimillionaire philanthropist and former chairman of the Aluminum Company of America (Alcoa); he had retired in 1957 as the third-richest person in the world with assets of $400 million, comparable to $3.2 billion in 2017.

November 18, 1962 (Sunday)
After a three-week pause during the Sino-Indian War in China's offensive on the Indian frontier to allow reinforcement and buildup of troops, a second and more massive invasion began, with Chinese troops overrunning Indian positions in the Indian state of Assam.
The first round of voting took place for the 482 seats in France's Chamber of Deputies, with 96 of the candidates winning a majority of the votes in their races, including 45 of Charles De Gaulle's UNR Party. The remaining 386 seats would be decided in the second round on November 25, with only a plurality of the votes required.
The Greek liberty ship Captain George exploded and sank with the loss of 18 crew.  Another 13 crew members were rescued.
Born: Kirk Hammett, American guitarist and songwriter in the heavy metal band Metallica, in San Francisco

Died: 
Niels Bohr, 77, Danish physicist and Nobel laureate. Element 107, bohrium, is named in his honor.
Dennis Chavez, 74, Hispanic American politician and U.S. Senator for New Mexico since 1935

November 19, 1962 (Monday)
A message in Morse code was transmitted from EPR (Evpatoria Planetary Radar) in the Soviet Union, directed at the planet Venus and using the second planet "as a passive reflector".  The "message", however, was simply the Russian word "Mir" (МИР) which can refer to the Earth, or to peace.  The medium was to repeat a pattern of signals of 30 seconds for "dash" and 10 seconds for "dot"  (— —)(· ·)(· — ·).
The Newfoundland general election was won by the Liberal Party of Newfoundland and Labrador, led by Joey Smallwood.
Born: Jodie Foster, American actress and film director, twice winner of Academy Award for Best Actress; as Alicia Christian Foster, in Los Angeles

November 20, 1962 (Tuesday)
Two days after launching an offensive that threatened to overrun northeast India, China suddenly announced a unilateral ceasefire in the Sino-Indian War, effective at midnight local time, and ordered that by December 1, its troops would withdraw  behind the "line of actual control" that had existed three years earlier.
János Kádár, Prime Minister of Hungary and General Secretary of the Hungarian Socialist Workers' Party, announced a general amnesty for all persons who participated in the 1956 Hungarian Revolution, effective March 21, 1963.
In response to the Soviet Union having removed its missiles and announcing that it would remove its Il-28 bombers from Cuba, President John F. Kennedy ended the U.S. quarantine proclaimed during the Cuban Missile Crisis.

November 21, 1962 (Wednesday)
The U.S. Federal Communications Commission issued the All-Channel Receiver Act, an order directing that all television sets manufactured in or imported into the United States, on or after April 30, 1964, had to be "all-channel equipped", to receive UHF channels 14 through 83 in addition to VHF channels 2 through 13.
At a mechanical systems coordination meeting, representatives of McDonnell and Manned Spacecraft Center decided to terminate McDonnell's subcontract with CTL Division of Studebaker for the backup Gemini heatshield. The decision resulted from growing confidence in the new McDonnell design as well as from CTL problems in fabricating heatshield No. 1. Termination of the CTL contract would save an estimated $131,000.
Born: Igor Škamperle, Slovenian mountaineer, sociologist and writer, in Trieste, Italy
Died: Sao Shwe Thaik, 68, first president of the Union of Burma and the last Saopha of Yawnghwe

November 22, 1962 (Thursday)
A mob of between 100 and 250 black South African members of the terrorist group Poqo marched from the township of Mbekweni and into white neighborhoods in the city of Paarl.  Armed with machetes and clubs, the group surrounded the police station, while others entered homes at random, and attacked residents in the early morning hours, while others vandalized storefronts in the downtown.
In the UK, the Chippenham by-election, caused by previous MP David Eccles, having been raised to the House of Lords, was won by Daniel Awdry of the Conservative Party.
Died: René Coty, 80, President of France 1954 to 1959

November 23, 1962 (Friday)
United Airlines Flight 297, a Vickers Viscount 754D, struck a flock of whistling swans while making an approach to Washington, D.C., and crashed north of Ellicott City, Maryland, killing all 17 people on board.  One of the swans collided with the left horizontal stabilizer on the tail section, causing the plane to go out of control and into the ground.

November 24, 1962 (Saturday)
General elections were held in Jordan, where all political parties were banned at the time.
The first episode of influential British satire show That Was The Week That Was was broadcast on BBC Television.

November 25, 1962 (Sunday)
The second round of voting for France's Chamber of Deputies took place, as President De Gaulle's UNR party won 188 of the remaining 386 seats still contested, giving the UNR a total of 233 seats in the 482 seat Chamber, 8 short of a majority.  With the support of at least 30 other candidates from other parties, the UNR had enough to form a coalition government.

November 26, 1962 (Monday)
German police ended their occupation of the offices of the West German weekly newsmagazine, Der Spiegel, bringing an end to the "Spiegel affair".
Mies Bouwman started presenting the first live TV-marathon fundraising show (Open Het Dorp), which lasted 23 hours non-stop.
The Beatles made their definitive recording of "Please Please Me" at EMI Studios in London. George Martin produced.

November 27, 1962 (Tuesday)

The first Boeing 727 was rolled out from its hangar in Seattle, and would be flown for the first time on February 9, 1963, with Eastern Airlines putting it into commercial service a year later.
French President Charles De Gaulle ordered Georges Pompidou to form a new government.

November 28, 1962 (Wednesday)
At the U.S. Embassy in Tokyo, Japanese artist Yoko Ono married fellow-artist Anthony Cox. At the time, the future wife of John Lennon was also married to (but separated from) composer Toshi Ichiyanagi, causing Ono to temporarily be in a state of bigamy that would be fixed by an annulment of the marriage to Cox, a divorce from Toshi, and a remarriage with Cox.
Mrs. Vijaya Lakshmi Pandit, sister of India's Prime Minister Jawaharlal Nehru, became Governor of the state of Maharashtra.

U.S. Postmaster General J. Edward Day announced the "Zoning Improvement Plan" that would implement a five-digit number identifying each post office in the United States, beginning on July 1, 1963. The "ZIP Code" was initially intended for businesses that had high speed electronic data sorters, but Day said that use by private citizens would not be mandatory, noting that "We're not too concerned if Aunt Minnie doesn't put the numbers on her letter." 
The United States Armed Forces returned its defense readiness condition to DEFCON 4 after having been at DEFCON 2 since October 23 during the start of the Cuban Missile Crisis.
Mercury Simulator 2 was modified to the 1-day Mercury orbital configuration in preparation for the Mercury-Atlas 9 (MA-9) flight.
On this date, the McDonnell Aircraft Corporation reported that as of October 31, 1962, it had expended 4,231,021 man-hours in engineering; 478,926 man-hours in tooling; and 2,509,830 man-hours in production in support of Project Mercury.
Retrofire was reported to have initiated 2 seconds late during the Mercury-Atlas 8 (MA-8) mission. Because of this, the mechanics and tolerances of the Mercury orbital timing device were reviewed for the benefit of operational personnel, and the procedural sequence for Mercury retrofire initiation was outlined.
Born: Jon Stewart, American comedian and host of The Daily Show, as Jonathan Stuart Leibowitz in New York City

Died: Queen Wilhelmina of the Netherlands, 82, who reigned from 1890 to 1948 before abdicating in favor of her daughter, Juliana.

November 29, 1962 (Thursday)
Britain and France signed an agreement to develop the Concorde supersonic airliner. Only 14 would ever enter service.
The Norwegian cargo liner Ragna Ringdal ran aground off Vatoa, Fiji. All passengers and crew would be rescued after three days.
Died: Erik Scavenius, 85, former Prime Minister of Denmark

November 30, 1962 (Friday)
Franz Josef Strauss was forced to resign as West Germany's Defence Minister. Strauss was relieved of his duties as a result of the "Spiegel affair", after being accused of ordering police action against the staff of the magazine Der Spiegel.
The United Nations General Assembly elected U Thant of Burma as the new UN Secretary-General.
Eastern Air Lines Flight 512, a Douglas DC-7B, crashed while trying to land in heavy fog at Idlewild Airport in New York City. Twenty-five of the 51 people on board were killed.
Gemini Project Office identified the primary problem area of the spacecraft liquid propellant rocket systems to be the development of a  thruster able to perform within specification over a burn time of five minutes. Three-minute chambers for the reaction control system (RCS) had been successfully tested, but the longer-duration chambers required for the orbit attitude and maneuver system (OAMS) had not. Rocketdyne was three weeks behind schedule in developmental testing of RCS and OAMS components, and five weeks behind in the systems testing.
Gemini Project Office reported revised facilities plans for implementing the preflight checkout of the Gemini spacecraft at Cape Canaveral. Project Gemini facilities were no longer to be wholly contained in the Hanger S complex on Cape Canaveral. Schedule changes and the elimination of incompatibilities between Apollo and Gemini spacecraft fuel-oxidizer and cryogenic systems made feasible the integration of Gemini facilities with the Apollo facilities planned for construction on Merritt Island. The first two Gemini spacecraft would be checked out in Hanger AF (as previously planned), but as soon as the Merritt Island facilities were complete the entire preflight checkout operation would shift to Merritt Island. The Merritt Island facilities were scheduled to be completed in the first quarter of 1964.

References

1962
1962-11
1962-11